Manuel "Manolo" Ruiz Pérez (born 3 December 1962) is a Spanish retired footballer who played as a goalkeeper, and a current manager.

Playing career
Ruiz was born in Jerez de la Frontera, Province of Cádiz, Andalusia. After playing youth football for UD Melilla and Atlético Sanluqueño CF, he signed for Xerez CD in 1979. Four years later, he moved to La Liga with Real Zaragoza, making his debut on 4 December 1983 in a 0–0 away draw against FC Barcelona.

During his four-year spell with the Aragonese, however, Ruiz only played in a combined nine league matches, barred by Andoni Cedrún which would later become a legendary player for the club. In 1985–86 he featured prominently for Zaragoza's reserves in Segunda División, in an eventual relegation-ending season.

Before retiring, Ruiz also played professionally for Deportivo de La Coruña – no appearances whatsoever due to a serious injury– and Levante UD, suffering another second division relegation with the latter side.

Coaching career
In 1997, shortly after retiring, Ruiz started coaching, starting with his first senior team Xerez and helping the Andalusians return to the second level in 2001 after a three-year absence. Subsequently, he was part of Bernd Schuster's staff at the Estadio Municipal de Chapín (in six matches comprising two separate seasons, he would also act as an interim manager).

Schuster signed with FC Shakhtar Donetsk in 2003, and Ruiz was one of four coaches as Xerez finished ninth in the second tier. When the German returned to Spain to join Levante UD, Ruiz re-joined his coaching staff, continuing to work with him at his following clubs, Getafe CF and Real Madrid, until he was dismissed from the latter in December 2008; amongst other tasks, he was charged with designing the teams' strategic set pieces.

Ruiz started a career as manager in his own right in 2011, being linked to AD Alcorcón and CE Sabadell FC in 2013. On 24 December 2015, he was named Real Balompédica Linense coach after replacing the fired Rafael Escobar.

Managerial statistics (second division)

References

External links

1962 births
Living people
Footballers from Jerez de la Frontera
Spanish footballers
Association football goalkeepers
La Liga players
Segunda División players
Segunda División B players
Xerez CD footballers
Real Zaragoza players
Real Zaragoza B players
Deportivo de La Coruña players
Levante UD footballers
UD Almería players
UD Melilla footballers
Atlético Sanluqueño CF players
Spain youth international footballers
Spanish football managers
Segunda División managers
Segunda División B managers
Xerez CD managers
Extremadura UD managers
Spanish expatriate sportspeople in Turkey